Norman Macfarlane Irons CBE (born 4 January 1941) was lord provost of Edinburgh, Scotland, between 1992 and 1996.

Irons was born on 4 January 1941. He was the first lord provost of the city from the Scottish National Party (SNP). Although Irons was one of only two SNP representatives on the city council at the time, these votes were crucial in maintaining the minority administration of the ruling Labour Party. As such, Labour councillors were his majority backers for the post of lord provost.

In 2005 he asserted that the Edinburgh Royal Infirmary killed his 89-year-old mother through "basic neglect" and improper care.

Irons currently serves as the honorary consul for Hungary in Edinburgh.

Irons was appointed CBE in the 1995 New Year Honours.

References

See also
List of Lord Provosts of Edinburgh

1941 births
Living people
Commanders of the Order of the British Empire
Lord Provosts of Edinburgh
Scottish National Party councillors